Giardini Naxos (English translation: Naxos Gardens) is a comune in the Metropolitan City of Messina on the island of Sicily in southern Italy. It is situated on the coast of the Ionian Sea on a bay which lies between Cape Taormina and Cape Schisò. Since the 1970s it has become a seaside-resort, a popular tourist destination and cruise ship stop.

History 

Founded by Thucles the Chalcidian in 734 BC, Naxos was never a powerful city, but its temple of Apollo Archegetes, protecting deity of all the Greek colonies, gave it prominence in religious affairs. Leontini and Catania were both colonized from here. Hippocrates, tyrant of Gela, captured it in 494 BC. Its opposition to Syracuse ultimately led to its capture and destruction in 403 BC at the hands of Dionysius the tyrant, after it had supported Athens during that city's disastrous Sicilian Expedition. Though the site continued to be inhabited, most activity shifted to neighbouring Tauromenium.

In 1544, following the raids by  corsair, Kheir-ed-Din, several military buildings were constructed to protect Cape Schisò from the Barbary pirates who continued to attack and plunder the coastal villages. These were Schisò Castle, which was rebuilt from an earlier 13th-century castle, Schisò fort, and Vignazza Tower. The latter is a quadrangular watchtower which served to patrol the coast south of Port Schisò; if any pirate boats were sighted, the observers inside the tower could alert the villagers and neighbouring watchtowers by sending out smoke signals. Vignazza Tower is located in the Recanati area of Giardini Naxos.

Economy  

Prior to the early 1970s, Giardini Naxos was a quiet fishing village. Now it is a tourist destination, its attractions including beaches, the panoramic view of the bay and surrounding hills, and its small fishing port. A larger port services the cruise ships which arrive regularly. It attracts foreign visitors and Italians alike, many of whom own summer residences in the comune. The seafront is lined with hotels, smaller pensions, pubs, lidos, restaurants and discos.

The town of Taormina is situated in the hills above Giardini Naxos and can be easily accessed by car and bus. Giardini Naxos also has several churches and an archaeological park.

References

External links
 Official website 

Colonies of Magna Graecia
Municipalities of the Metropolitan City of Messina
730s BC
Populated places established in the 8th century BC
8th-century BC establishments in Italy